The XLVII Award of the Premio Ariel (2005) of the Academia Mexicana de Artes y Ciencias Cinematográficas took place on March 29 of 2005 at the Palacio de Bellas Artes. The Premio Ariel for the best movie was awarded to Temporada de patos.

List of winners and nominees

Best film

Winner
Temporada de patos
Producers: Lulú Producciones, Cine Pantera, Fondo de inversión y estímulos al cine (Fidecine) and Instituto Mexicano de Cinematografía (Imcine)

Nominees
 Manos libres (Nadie te habla)
Producers: Producciones Tragaluz, Fondo de inversión y estímulos al cine (Fidecine)
 Voces inocentes
Producers: Altavista Films, Organización Santo Domingo, Luis Mandoki Productions, Lawrence Bender Productions, Muvi Films and Toonxtudios

Best director

Winner
Fernando Eimbcke for Temporada de patos

Nominees
 José Buil for Manos libres (Nadie te habla)
 Luis Mandoki for Voces inocentes

Best Iberoamerican film

Winner
Whisky by Pablo Stoll and Juan Pablo Rebella (Uruguay)

Nominees
 Machuca by Andrés Wood (Chile)
 Te doy mis ojos by Icíar Bollaín (Spain)

Opera Prima

Winner
Temporada de patos of Fernando Eimbcke

Nominees
 Adán y Eva (Todavía) of Iván Ávila Dueñas
 Santos peregrinos of Juan Carlos Carrasco

Best cinematography

Winner
Alexis Zabé por Temporada de patos

Nominees
 Alejandro Cantú & Ciro Cabello for Adán y Eva (Todavía)
 Juan Ruiz Anchía for Voces inocentes

Best actress

Winner
Danny Perea for Temporada de patos

Nominees
 Ana Paula Corpus for Manos libres (Nadie te habla)
 Leonor Varela for Voces inocentes
 Vanessa Bauche for Digna... hasta el último aliento

Best actor

Winner
Enrique Arreola for Temporada de patos

Nominees
 Silverio Palacios for Cero y van cuatro
 Alejandro Calva for Manos libres (Nadie te habla)

Best supporting actress

Winner
Ofelia Medina for Voces inocentes

Nominees
 Yuriria del Valle for Manos libres (Nadie te habla)
 Paloma Woolrich for Santos peregrinos

Best supporting actor

Winner
Carlos Cobos for Conejo en la luna

Nominees
 Raúl Méndez for Matando Cabos
 Joaquín Cosío for Matando Cabos

Best documentary

Winner
Digna... hasta el último aliento of Felipe Cazals

Nominees
 Los niños de Morelia of Juan Pablo Villaseñor
 Trópico de cáncer of Eugenio Polgovsky

Best Opera Prima documentary

Winner
Trópico de cáncer of Eugenio Polgovsky

Nominees
 Milagros concedidos of Andrea Álvarez & Luciana Kaplan
 Relatos desde el encierro of Guadalupe Miranda

Best short documentary

Winner
Soy of Lucía Gajá

Nominees
 El blues de Paganini of David Villalvazo & Yordi Capó
 La vida no vale nada of Eduardo González Ibarra
 Tierra caliente... se mueren los que la mueven of Francisco Vargas

Best short film

Winner
 Un viaje of Gabriela Monroy

Nominees
 El otro sueño americano of Enrique Arroyo
 La Nao de China of Patricia Arriaga

Best animation short

Winner
De raíz of Carlos Carrera

Nominees
 La guerra of Rubén Silva
 La historia de todos of Blanca Aguerre

Best original script

Winner
Fernando Eimbcke for Temporada de patos

Nominees
 Iván Ávila Dueñas for Adán y Eva (Todavía)
 Jorge Ramírez-Suárez for Conejo en la luna
 José Buil for Manos libres (Nadie te habla)

Best adaptation

Winner
María Elena Velasco, Iván Lipkies & Ivette Lipkies for Huapango

Best original score

Winner
Alejandro Rosso & Liquits for Temporada de patos

Nominees
 Rosino Serrano for Adán y Eva (Todavía)
 Eduardo Gamboa for Conejo en la luna

Best sound

Winner
Lena Esquenazi, Miguel Hernández & Antonio Diego for Temporada de patos

Nominees
 Carlos Aguilar & Ernesto Gaytán for Manos libres (Nadie te habla)
 Jaime Baksht & Fernando Cámara for Voces inocentes

Best art design

Winner
Diana Quiroz & Luisa Guala for Temporada de patos

Nominees
 Ivonne Fuentes for Adán y Eva (Todavía)
 Antonio Muñohierro & Luisa Guala por Voces inocentes

Best make-up

Winner
David Ruiz Gameros for Voces inocentes

Nominees
 Maripaz Robles for Adán y Eva (Todavía)
 Carlos Sánchez, Carmen de la Torre & Roberto Ortiz por Matando Cabos

Best wardrobe

Winner
Junior Paulino & Lourdes del Valle por Adán y Eva (Todavía)

Nominees
 Alejandra Dorantes for Manos libres (Nadie te habla)
 Lissi de la Concha for Temporada de patos

Best editing

Winner
Mariana Rodríguez for Temporada de patos

Nominees
 Alberto de Toro for Matando Cabos
 Aleshka Ferrero for Voces inocentes

Best special effects

Winner
Jesús Durán for Voces inocentes

Nominees
 Edgar Lezama "Chivata" for Manos libres (Nadie te habla)
 Alejandro Vázquez & Edgar Lezama "Chivata" for Matando Cabos

Awards per movie
 Temporada de patos (11)
Best film, director, edition, art design, sound, original score, original screenplay, actor, actress, cinematography and Opera Prima

 Voces inocentes (3)
Best special effects, make-up, supporting actress

 Adán y Eva (1)
Best wardrobe

 Huapango (1)
Best adaptation

 De raíz (1)
Best animation short

 Un viaje (1)
Best short film

Soy (1)
Best short documentary

Trópico de cáncer (1)
Best Opera Prima documentary

Digna... hasta el último aliento (1)
Best documentary

 Conejo en la luna (1)
Best supporting actress

 Whisky (1)
Best Iberoamerican film

References

External links
XLVII Ariel Awards (2005) 

Ariel Awards ceremonies
2005 film awards
Ariel